is an action role-playing game developed by Chunsoft and published by Bandai on December 2, 1991. The sequel to Famicom Jump: Hero Retsuden, the game features seven main characters from different Weekly Shōnen Jump manga serialized at the time. Only four of the 16 represented titles from the original are brought back, while the remaining three are new to the sequel. There would not be another crossover game until the release of Jump Super Stars and Jump Ultimate Stars.

Main characters
The player may begin the game with any of these seven characters. The player character chosen reflects the path the player will take through the characters' universes- starting from the selected character's home universe.

 Son Goku (Dragon Ball Z)
 Ryotsu Kankichi (Kochira Katsushika-ku Kameari Kōen-mae Hashutsujo)
 Momotaro Tsurugi (Sakigake!! Otokojuku)
 Jotaro Kujo (JoJo's Bizarre Adventure, replaces Joseph Joestar)
 Tar-chan (Jungle King Tar-chan)
 Tarurūto (Magical Taluluto)
 Maeda Taison (Rokudenashi Blues)

External links

1991 video games
Action role-playing video games
Chunsoft games
Crossover role-playing video games
Dragon Ball games
Japan-exclusive video games
JoJo's Bizarre Adventure games
Nintendo Entertainment System games
Nintendo Entertainment System-only games
Video games based on anime and manga
Video games developed in Japan
Weekly Shōnen Jump (video game series)